The 2012 UEFA European Under-17 Championship was the eleventh edition of UEFA's European Under-17 Football Championship under its current age grouping. Slovenia hosted the tournament between 4 and 16 May. An appeal by the Hungarian Football Federation to have Hungary replace Belgium over an ineligible player in the Belgium V Russia elite round match was unsuccessful.

Players born after 1 January 1995 were eligible to participate in this competition.

Venues
The tournament was held in Domžale, Lendava, Ljubljana and Maribor. The selected stadiums that hosted the matches were:

Qualification

The final tournament of the 2012 UEFA European Under-17 Championship was preceded by two qualification stages: a qualifying round and an Elite round. During these rounds, 52 national teams competed to determine the seven teams.

Participants

 
 
 
 
 
 
 
 (hosts)

1. Teams that made their debut (as an Under 17 side).

Match officials 
A total of 6 referees, 8 assistant referees and 2 fourth officials were appointed for the final tournament.

Referees
 Emir Alečković
 Marius Avram
 Mattias Gestranius
 Ivan Kruzliak
 Harald Lechner
 Alan Mario Sant

Assistant referees
 Milutin Djukič
 Mark Gavin
 Serkan Gençerler
 Haralds Gudermanis
 Mubariz Hashimov
 Borut Križarić
 Leif Opland
 Jean-Yves Wicht

Fourth officials
 Mitja Žganec
 Dejan Balažič

Group stage 
All times are local (UTC+02:00).

Group A

Group B

Knockout stage

Bracket

All times are local (UTC+2)

Semifinals

Final

Goalscorers
3 goals
 Max Meyer
2 goals
 Leon Goretzka
1 goals

 Tuur Dierckx
 Pieter Gerkens
 Siebe Schrijvers
 Mohamed Chemlal
 Thomas Lemar
 Anthony Martial
 Chiaber Chechelasvili
 Dato Dartsimelia
 Max Dittgen
 Marc Stendera
 Gunnlaugur Birgisson
 Hjörtur Hermannsson
 Elton Acolatse
 Nathan Aké
 Thom Haye
 Jorrit Hendrix
 Jeroen Lumu
 Rai Vloet
 Vincent Rabiega
 Mariusz Stępiński
 Bian Paul Šauperl
 Petar Stojanović
 Luka Zahović

Tournament select squad

Goalkeepers
  Oliver Schnitzler
  Nick Olij

Defenders
  Corentin Fiore
  Otar Kakabadze
  Marian Sarr
  Jeremy Dudziak
  Hjörtur Hermannsson
  Jorrit Hendrix

Midfielders
  Pieter Gerkens
  Giorgi Gorozia
  Leon Goretzka
  Oliver Sigurjónsson
  Dino Hotić
  Nathan Aké
  Thom Haye
  Tonny Vilhena

Forwards
  Tuur Dierckx
  Corentin Jean
  Julian Brandt
  Max Meyer
  Marc Stendera
  Mariusz Stępiński

References

External links 
 Official website
 Official website

 
2011–12 in European football
2012
2012 UEFA European Under-17 Championship
2011–12 in Slovenian football
May 2012 sports events in Europe
2012 in youth association football